Cry of a Prostitute (also known as Love Kills and Guns of the Big Shots) is a 1974 Italian gangster film directed by Andrea Bianchi.

Plot 
Hitman Tony Aniante returns to his native Sicily after having spent many years in the United States. Upon his arrival, the rival families Cantimo and Scannapieco contend for his services, unaware that Aniante's plan is actually to pit one against the other in order to take power, for which a reformed prostitute joins forces with him.

Cast 
 Henry Silva as Tony Aniante
 Barbara Bouchet as Margie 
 Fausto Tozzi as Don Ricuzzo
 Vittorio Sanipoli as Don Cascemi
 Patrizia Gori as Carmela
 Dada Gallotti as Santa Scannapieco 
 Mario Landi as Don Turi Scannapieco
 Alfredo Pea as Zino
 Carla Mancini as Margie's Maid

Production
Cry of a Prostitute was filmed at Incir-De Paolis in Rome and on location in Savona.

Release
Cry of a Prostitute was released on 11 January 1974 in Italy, where it was distributed by Jumbo. The film grossed a total of 444,963,000 Italian lire. The film was released on VHS as Cry of a Prostitute: Love Kills and on DVD by Televista. The Televista release is cut to 86 minutes.

Reception
Austin Fisher in Blood in the Streets: Histories of Violence in Italian Crime Cinema wrote that the film was one in a series of Italian film, alongside La mala ordina (The Italian Connection, also starring Henry Silva) and Milano rovente (Gang War in Milan) that featured "'fixers' travelling over from the USA to resolve problems in the Italian mafia" and "overtly position American practices as the epitome of efficient modernity, in contrast to outmoded Italian ways of conducting business."

Notes

References

External links

Cry of a Prostitute at Variety Distribution

Italian crime drama films
1970s Italian-language films
1970s crime drama films
Films directed by Andrea Bianchi
1974 drama films
1974 films
1970s Italian films